In mathematics, the Anger function, introduced by , is a function defined as

 

and is closely related to  Bessel functions.

 

and is closely related to Bessel functions of the second kind.

Relation between Weber and Anger functions

The Anger and Weber functions are related by

so in particular if ν is not an integer they can be expressed as linear combinations of each other.  If ν is an integer then Anger functions Jν are the same as Bessel functions Jν, and Weber functions can be expressed as finite linear combinations of Struve functions.

Power series expansion
The Anger function has the power series expansion

While the Weber function has the power series expansion

Differential equations
The Anger and Weber functions are solutions of inhomogeneous forms of Bessel's equation 

 

More precisely, the Anger functions satisfy the equation

and the Weber functions satisfy the equation

Recurrence relations
The Anger function satisfies this inhomogeneous form of recurrence relation

While the Weber function satisfies this inhomogeneous form of recurrence relation

Delay differential equations
The Anger and Weber functions satisfy these homogeneous forms of delay differential equations

The Anger and Weber functions also satisfy these inhomogeneous forms of delay differential equations

References

C.T. Anger, Neueste Schr. d. Naturf. d. Ges. i. Danzig, 5  (1855)  pp. 1–29

G.N. Watson, "A treatise on the theory of Bessel functions", 1–2, Cambridge Univ. Press  (1952)
H.F. Weber, Zurich Vierteljahresschrift, 24  (1879)  pp. 33–76

Special functions